The Karimun Regency is located in the Riau Islands Province, Indonesia. Besides the central island of Great Karimun, the regency also includes the islands of Kundur and over 240 smaller islands. The district covers a land area of 1,524 km2 and a sea area of 6,460 km2, and its population was 212,561 at the 2010 Census and 253,457 at the 2020 Census.

Administrative Districts
The Regency was formerly divided into nine districts (kecamatan), but on 11 June 2012 a further three districts were added - Ungar (from part of Kundur district), Belat (from part of Kundur Utara district), and Meral Barat (out of the western part of Meral). The twelve districts are tabulated below with their areas and populations at the 2010 Census and 2020 Census. The table also includes the locations of the district administrative centres, the number of administrative villages (rural desa and urban kelurahan) and the number of islands within each district, and their postal codes.

Great Karimun Island (Pulau Karimunbesar) comprises the districts of Tebing, Meral and Meral Barat, together with the northern part (which forms Tanjung Balai town) of Karimun District. Kundur Island is a group of islands comprising the districts of Kundur, Ungar, Kundur Barat, Kundur Utara, Belat and Buru, together with the southern part (Parit desa and Tulang desa) of Karimun District.

Note: (a) a group of islands east of Kundur, situated to the southwest of Batam Island; the largest islands are Sugi, Citlim and Moro. (b) a group of islands situated to the southeast of Kundur Island. (c) the 2010 Census figure for the new Ungar District is included with that for Kundur District, from which the new district was cut out on 11 June 2012.
(d) the 2010 Census figure for the new Belat District is included with that for Kundur Utara District, from which the new district was cut out on 11 June 2012.
(e) the 2010 Census figure for the new Meral Barat District is included with that for Meral District, from which the new district was cut out on 11 June 2012.

Demographics

Religion

Islam is the dominant religion in the regency, with 84.09% of the total population identifying as Muslim. Other religions are Buddhism, which forms 10.68% of the total population, Christianity, which forms 4.85% of the total population, Hinduism, which forms 0.01% of the total population, and Confucianism, which forms 0.37% of the total population.

References

External links

See also
 Great Karimun, the main island in the regency
 Little Karimun
 Kundur Island

Regencies of the Riau Islands